Étienne Martinetti (30 June 1940 – 1 April 2002) was a Swiss wrestler who competed in the 1972 Summer Olympics.

References

External links
 

1940 births
2002 deaths
Olympic wrestlers of Switzerland
Wrestlers at the 1972 Summer Olympics
Swiss male sport wrestlers